Felts may refer to:
 Narvel Felts (born 1938), American country music singer
 Nollie Felts (1905–1974), American football player
 Baldwin–Felts Detective Agency, a U.S. private detective agency founded by William Gibboney Baldwin and Thomas Lafayette

See also 
 Felt (disambiguation)